Archepandemis borealis is a species of moth of the family Tortricidae. It is found in North America, where it has been recorded from Ontario and Maine.

References

Moths described in 1965
Archipini
Moths of North America